"Te Robaré" (English: "I’ll Kidnap You") is a 2013 bachata song by American recording artist Prince Royce. The song was released in February 2014 as the second single lifted from Royce's third studio album, Soy el Mismo (2013).

Music video
The music video was released on 3 February 2014..

Charts

Weekly charts

Year-end charts

Certifications

Awards and nominations

See also
List of Billboard number-one Latin songs of 2014

References

2013 songs
2014 singles
Prince Royce songs
Bachata songs
Songs written by Prince Royce
Sony Music Latin singles